This is a list of Dutch provinces by Human Development Index as of 2021.

References 

Human Development Index
Netherlands
Netherlands, Human Development Index